Fernando J. Abugattas Aboino (born 13 April 1948) is a Peruvian high jumper. He competed in the 1968 Summer Olympics.

References

1948 births
Living people
Athletes (track and field) at the 1968 Summer Olympics
Peruvian male high jumpers
Olympic athletes of Peru
People from Pisco, Peru